Partido por la Libertad (PxL) is a far-right political party active in Spain, with the exception of Catalonia, where its represented by its sister-party PxC.

History
In 2012, Josep Anglada of PxC announced the launch of the Plataforma por la Libertad (PxL), an expansion of the party into the rest of Spain. Anglada and the PxL have protested against the construction of mosques in Spain. Plataforma por la Libertad was refounded in 2013 as the Party for Freedom. PxL run in many municipalities in the local elections of 2015, gaining two town councillors (one in Alfoz de Lloredo and another in Valdeavero).

References

External links 
 

Far-right political parties in Spain
Political parties in Catalonia
Right-wing populism in Spain
Anti-Islam political parties in Europe
2013 establishments in Spain
Anti-Islam sentiment in Spain
Spanish nationalism
Political parties established in 2013
Identitarian movement